Crassuncus orophilus is a moth of the family Pterophoridae. It is known from Madagascar.

References

orophilus
Moths of Madagascar
Moths of Africa
Moths described in 1994